The 2018–19 Texas State Bobcats men's basketball team represents Texas State University in the 2018–19 NCAA Division I men's basketball season. The Bobcats, led by sixth-year head coach Danny Kaspar, play their home games at Strahan Coliseum in San Marcos, Texas as members of the Sun Belt Conference.

Previous season
The Bobcats finished the 2017-2018 season 15–18, 7–11 in Sun Belt play to finish in a tie for ninth place. As the No. 9 seed in the Sun Belt tournament, they defeated Coastal Carolina before losing to Louisiana in the quarterfinals.

Roster

Schedule 

|-
!colspan=9 style=| Non-conference regular season

|-
!colspan=9 style=| Sun Belt regular season
|-

|-
!colspan=9 style=| Sun Belt tournament

|-
!colspan=12 style=|CollegeInsider.com Postseason tournament

|-

References

Texas State Bobcats men's basketball seasons
Texas State
Texas State
Texas State
Texas State